is a quasi-national park in Hokkaidō, Japan.

The park includes the following areas:
 Mashike Mountains
 Teuri Island
 Yagishiri Island

See also
List of national parks of Japan

References

National parks of Japan
Parks and gardens in Hokkaido
Protected areas established in 1990
1990 establishments in Japan